Temnora crenulata is a moth of the family Sphingidae. It is known from forests from Sierra Leone to Congo, Uganda and western Kenya, with an isolated population in the Usambara Mountains of north-eastern Tanzania.

Description
The length of the forewings is 22–28 mm. The head and body are grey. There is a narrow elevated blackish crest on the head, becoming buff on the thorax. The apex of the forewing is acute. The forewings are grey, mottled and lined with blackish. There is a reddish-brown bar running from the middle of the costa which is more clearly defined distally than proximally. The hindwings are dark greyish brown except at tornus and inner margin, where they are grey. There is a series of pinkish-buff spots at the posterior margin of the abdominal sternites and a series of creamy spots at each side. The abdominal tufts are bright red.

Subspecies
Temnora crenulata crenulata
Temnora crenulata obsoleta Darge, 2004 (Tanzania)

References

Further reading

Temnora
Moths described in 1893
Moths of Africa